Kadri Gjata (1865–1912) was an Albanian patriot, writer and educator. He was awarded posthumously with the Honor of the Nation (Nderi i Kombit in Albanian) medal and the title Martyr of the Nation.

Kadri Gjata was born in Libohovë in 1865. After finishing his secondary education in Janina he studied law in Istanbul. In 1905 he created the patriotic organization Unity (Bashkimi in Albanian) in Janina. In Janina he started publishing the Albanian journal Zgjimi i Shqipërisë. In 1910 he established the Albanian organization Toskëria and an Albanian-language school in Janina.

He was assassinated by a group of 22 Greek agents in the night of July 12, 1912. He was honoured with the title Martyr of the Nation. A school in Delvinë was renamed in the 2000s as Kadri Gjata and in 2003 he was awarded posthumously with the medal Honour of the Nation (Nderi i Kombit), one of the highest medals of Albania.

Bibliography 
Enciklopedia Jugshqiptare, p. 781–83, 2006
The development of Islamic culture among Albanians during the 20th century, p. 252
 Awards of the medal Honour of the Nation

External links 
One century from Zgjim I Shqiperise (Gazeta Koha Jone, one of the highest selling newspapers of Albania)
Gazeta Ndryshe

1865 births
1912 deaths
Albanian writers
Albanian educators
People murdered in Albania
People from Libohovë
Assassinated Albanian people
Activists of the Albanian National Awakening
Istanbul University Faculty of Law alumni